Putnam Cemetery is a non-sectarian cemetery located at 35 Parsonage Road in Greenwich, Connecticut. It is affiliated with adjacent Saint Mary's Cemetery at 399 North Street, which is a Catholic cemetery; the two cemeteries share the same office. The cemetery is located in a quiet residential neighborhood and is the final resting place of several notable people. Some of these renowned individuals are listed below.

Putnam division
 Elizabeth Milbank Anderson (1850–1921), philanthropist
 Victor Borge (1909–2000), pianist, symphony conductor, comedian
 Prescott Bush (1895–1972), US Senator, and Dorothy Walker Bush (1901–1992), presidential parents and grandparents
 Bud Collyer (1908–1969), television show host
 G. Lauder Greenway (1904–1981), Chairman of the Metropolitan Opera Association and patron of the arts
 James Cowan Greenway (1903–1989), Ornithologist, Curator of Birds at the Museum of Comparative Zoology at Harvard
 Thomas Hastings (1860–1929), architect
 William Temple Hornaday (1854–1937), wildlife conservationist, director of the N.Y. Zoological Park
 George Lauder (1837–1924), Scottish-American industrialist
 Alden McWilliams (1916–1993), cartoonist
 Jeremiah Milbank (1818–1884), co-founder, Borden's Milk Company
 Martha Elizabeth Moxley (1960–1975), murder victim
 Ezio Pinza (1892–1957), opera singer
 Townsend Scudder (1865–1960), US Congressman
 Anya Seton (1916–1990), author
 Walter C Teagle (1878–1962), president of Standard Oil Company of New Jersey.
 Alec Templeton (1909–1963), composer & pianist
 Douglass Watson (1921–1989), actor
 Lebbeus R. Wilfley (1866–1926), international judge

Saint Mary's division
 Jack Lescoulie (1912–1987), television show host
 Eddie Lopat (1918–1992), Major League Baseball player & manager
 Albert P. Morano (1908–1987), US Congressman
 William Ryan (1840–1925), US Congressman
 George Skakel (1892–1955) and wife Ann Brannack (1892–1955), parents of Ethel Kennedy
 William L. Tierney (1876–1958), US Congressman
 Leonard Warren (1911–1960), American baritone

References

External links 
 
 
   
 

Greenwich, Connecticut
Cemeteries in Fairfield County, Connecticut